Vital capacity (VC) is the maximum amount of air a person can expel from the lungs after a maximum inhalation. It is equal to the sum of inspiratory reserve volume, tidal volume, and expiratory reserve volume. It is approximately equal to Forced Vital Capacity (FVC).

A person's vital capacity can be measured by a wet or regular spirometer. In combination with other physiological measurements, the vital capacity can help make a diagnosis of underlying lung disease. Furthermore, the vital capacity is used to determine the severity of respiratory muscle involvement in neuromuscular disease, and can guide treatment decisions in Guillain–Barré syndrome and myasthenic crisis.

A normal adult has a vital capacity between 3 and 5 litres. A human's vital capacity depends on age, sex, height, mass, and possibly ethnicity. However, the dependence on ethnicity is poorly understood or defined, as it was first established by studying black slaves in the 19th century and may be the result of conflation with environmental factors.

Lung volumes and lung capacities refer to the volume of air associated with different phases of the respiratory cycle. Lung volumes are directly measured, whereas lung capacities are inferred from volumes.

Role in diagnosis 

The vital capacity can be used to help differentiate causes of lung disease. In restrictive lung disease the vital capacity is decreased. In obstructive lung disease it is usually normal or only slightly decreased.

Estimated vital capacities

Formulas 
Vital capacity increases with height and decreases with age. Formulas to estimate vital capacity are:

References

Further reading 
Several studies have been made to measure and predict vital capacity:
 
 
 
 
 
 
 

Respiratory physiology